The Elgin Marbles are a collection of Ancient Greek sculptures from the Parthenon and other structures from the Acropolis of Athens, removed from Ottoman Greece to Britain by agents of Thomas Bruce, 7th Earl of Elgin, and now held in the British Museum. The majority of the sculptures were created in the 5th century BCE under the direction of sculptor and architect Phidias.

The term Parthenon Marbles or Parthenon Sculptures refers to sculptures—the frieze, metopes and pediments—from the Parthenon held in various collections, principally the British Museum and Acropolis Museum. 

From 1801 to 1812, Elgin's agents removed about half the surviving Parthenon sculptures, as well as sculptures from the Erechtheion, the Temple of Athena Nike and the Propylaia, sending them to Britain in efforts to establish a private museum. Elgin stated he removed the marbles with permission of the Ottoman officials who exercised authority in Athens at the time. However, the veracity of this claim has been disputed. 

The marbles' presence in the British Museum is the subject of longstanding international controversy. In Britain, the acquisition of the collection was supported by some, while others, such as Lord Byron, likened Elgin's actions to vandalism or looting. A UK parliamentary inquiry in 1816 concluded that Elgin had acquired the marbles legally. Elgin sold them to the British government in that year, after which they passed into the trusteeship of the British Museum.

In 1983 the Greek government formally asked the UK government to return the marbles to Greece, and subsequently listed the dispute with UNESCO. The UK government and British Museum declined UNESCO's offer of mediation. In 2021, UNESCO called upon the UK government to resolve the issue at the intergovernmental level.

The Greek government and supporters of the marbles' return to Greece have argued that the marbles were obtained illegally or unethically, that they are of exceptional cultural importance to Greece, and that their cultural value would be best appreciated in a unified public display with the other major Parthenon marbles and Greek antiquities in the Acropolis Museum. The UK government and British Museum have argued that the marbles were obtained legally, that their return would set a precedent which could undermine the collections of the major museums of world culture, and that the British Museum's collection allows the marbles to be better viewed in the context of other major ancient cultures and thus complements the perspective provided by the Acropolis Museum. Discussions between UK and Greek officials about the future of the marbles are ongoing.

Name
The Elgin Marbles are named after Thomas Bruce, 7th Earl of Elgin, who between 1801 and 1812 oversaw the removal of the marbles from the Parthenon, the Erechtheion, the Temple of Athena Nike and the Propylaia and their shipment to England. In 1816, by an act of parliament, the collection was transferred to the British Museum on the condition that it be kept together and named "the Elgin Marbles". The term "Parthenon Marbles" or "Parthenon Sculptures" refers to the sculptures and architectural features removed specifically from the Parthenon. These are currently held in nine museums around the world, principally the Acropolis Museum and the British Museum. The term "Parthenon Sculptures" is used in this sense by the British Museum and the Greek government.

Background
Built in the ancient era, the Parthenon was extensively damaged by earthquakes. Also, during the Sixth Ottoman–Venetian War (1684–1699) against the Ottoman Empire, the defending Turks fortified the Acropolis and used the Parthenon as a castle and gunpowder store. On 26 September 1687, a Venetian artillery round, fired from the Hill of Philopappus, ignited the gunpowder, and the resulting explosion blew up the Parthenon, and the building was partly destroyed. The explosion blew out the building's central portion and caused the cella's walls to crumble into rubble. Three of the four walls collapsed, or nearly so, and about three-fifths of the sculptures from the frieze fell. About three hundred people were killed in the explosion, which showered marble fragments over a significant area. For the next century and a half, portions of the remaining structure were scavenged for building material and looted of any remaining objects of value.

Acquisition

In November 1798, the Earl of Elgin was appointed as "Ambassador Extraordinary and Minister Plenipotentiary of His Britannic Majesty to the Sublime Porte of Selim III, Sultan of Turkey" (Greece was then part of the Ottoman Empire). Before his departure to take up the post he had approached officials of the British government to inquire if they would be interested in employing artists to take casts and drawings of the sculptured portions of the Parthenon. According to Elgin, "the answer of the Government ... was entirely negative."

Elgin decided to carry out the work himself, and employed artists to take casts and drawings under the supervision of the Neapolitan court painter, Giovanni Lusieri. According to a Turkish local, marble sculptures that fell were being burned to obtain lime for building. Although his original intention was only to document the sculptures, in 1801 Elgin began to remove material from the Parthenon and its surrounding structures under the supervision of Lusieri. Pieces were also removed from the Erechtheion, the Propylaia, and the Temple of Athena Nike, all inside the Acropolis.

The marbles were taken from Greece to Malta, then a British protectorate, where they remained for a number of years until they were transported to Britain. The excavation and removal was completed in 1812 at a personal cost to Elgin of £74,240 (equivalent to £ in  pounds). Elgin intended to use the marbles for a private museum to enhance the art of the nation, but a costly divorce suit forced him to sell them to settle his debts. Elgin sold the Parthenon Marbles to the British government for £35,000, less than half of what it cost him to procure them, declining higher offers from other potential buyers, including Napoleon.

Description

The Parthenon Marbles acquired by Elgin include some 21 figures from the statuary from the east and west pediments, 15 of an original 92 metope panels depicting battles between the Lapiths and the Centaurs, as well as 75 metres of the Parthenon Frieze which decorated the horizontal course set above the interior architrave of the temple. As such, they represent more than half of what now remains of the surviving sculptural decoration of the Parthenon.

Elgin's acquisitions also included objects from other buildings on the Athenian Acropolis: a Caryatid from Erechtheum; four slabs from the parapet frieze of the Temple of Athena Nike; and a number of other architectural fragments of the Parthenon, Propylaia, Erechtheum, the Temple of Athene Nike, and the Treasury of Atreus.

The British Museum also holds additional fragments from the Acropolis acquired from various collections that have no connection with Elgin.

Legality of the removal from Athens
In February 1816, a House of Commons Select Committee held public hearings on whether Elgin had acquired the marbles legally and whether they should be purchased by the government. In his evidence to the committee, Elgin stated that the work of his agents at the Acropolis and the removal of the marbles were authorised by a firman (official edict) from the Sultan obtained in July 1801, and was undertaken with the approval of the voivode (civil governor of Athens) and the disdar (military commander of the Acropolis citadel). In March 1810, another firman was obtained, authorising the second shipment of marbles from Athens to Britain. Elgin told the committee, " … the thing was done publicly before the whole world … and all the local authorities were concerned in it, as well as the Turkish government ".

The committee cleared Elgin of all allegations that he had acquired the marbles illegally or had misused his powers as ambassador. Elgin's version of events, however, remains controversial. No official record of the July 1801 firman has been found in the Turkish archives. An Italian translation of the purported firman is held by the British Museum, and an English translation was submitted to the 1816 Select Committee. The document states in part,

Vassilis Demetriades, of the University of Crete, argues that the document is not a firmam (a decree from the Sultan), or a buyuruldi (an order from the Grand Vizier) but a mektub (letter) from the Sultan’s acting Grand Vizier which didn’t have the force of law. Dyfri Williams states that although the document isn't a firman in the technical sense, the term was widely used informally in diplomatic and court circles to refer to a range of official Ottoman documents. He argues that the document is possibly a buyuruldi, but "[w]hatever the exact form of the document was, it clearly had to be obeyed, and it was."There is debate over whether the document authorised Elgin's agents to remove sculptures attached to the Parthenon and other structures. Demetriades, Rudenstine and others argue that the document only authorised Elgin's party to remove artefacts recovered from the permitted excavations, not those still attached to buildings. Williams argues that the document was "rather open ended" and that the civil governor agreed with Hunt's interpretation that it allowed Elgin's party to remove sculptures fixed to buildings. Beard concludes, "No amount of poring over the text can provide the answer. As often with documents sent out from head office, the precise interpretation would rest with men carrying out the orders on the spot."

Legal academic John Merryman argues that the document provides only "slender authority" for the removal of the fixed sculptures, but that legally Elgin's actions were ratified by the conduct of Ottoman officials. In 1802, Ottoman officials in Constantinople issued documents to the civil governor and the military commander of Athens ratifying their conduct and, in March 1810, issued a command allowing Elgin to transport a shipment of marbles from Greece to Britain.

Rudenstine, in reply, states that no official copies of these documents have been found, we only have the evidence of Elgin's agents and the British Embassy regarding their contents, and therefore we can't reach a conclusion regarding the extent to which they ratified Elgin's actions.

A number of eyewitnesses to the removal of the marbles from the Acropolis, including members of Elgin's party, stated that expensive bribes and gifts to local officials were required to ensure the work progressed. Merryman argues that the bribery did not make the acquisition of the marbles illegal by the standards of the time. "The Ottomans who were bribed were the responsible officials. Whatever their motivation may have been, they had the legal authority to perform those actions. At a time and in a culture in which officials routinely had to be bribed to perform their legal duties (as is still true today in much of the world), the fact that bribes occurred was hardly a significant legal consideration."

Rudenstine, however, states that further investigation would be required to determine whether, at the time, bribery would have been a significant legal consideration in such official transactions under Ottoman or British law.

Contemporary reaction

When, in 1807, Elgin put the first shipment of marbles on display in London they were "an instant success among many" who admired the sculptures and supported their arrival. The sculptor John Flaxman thought them superior to "the treasures of Italy", and Benjamin West called them "sublime specimens of the purest sculpture". Henry Fuseli was enthusiastic, and his friend Benjamin Haydon became a tireless advocate for their importance. Classicist Richard Payne Knight, however, declared they were Roman additions or the work of inferior craftsmen, and painter Ozias Humphrey called them "a mass of ruins".Lord Byron strongly objected to the removal of the marbles from Greece, denouncing Elgin as a vandal. In his narrative poem Childe Harold's Pilgrimage, published in 1812, he wrote in relation to the Parthenon:::Dull is the eye that will not weep to see
Thy walls defaced, thy mouldering shrines removed
By British hands, which it had best behoved
To guard those relics ne'er to be restored.
Curst be the hour when from their isle they roved,
And once again thy hapless bosom gored,
And snatch'd thy shrinking gods to northern climes abhorred!Byron was not the only one to protest against the removal at the time. Sir John Newport said:Edward Daniel Clarke witnessed the removal of the metopes and called the action a "spoliation", writing that "thus the form of the temple has sustained a greater injury than it had already experienced from the Venetian artillery," and that "neither was there a workman employed in the undertaking ... who did not express his concern that such havoc should be deemed necessary, after moulds and casts had been already made of all the sculpture which it was designed to remove." When Sir Francis Ronalds visited Athens and Giovanni Battista Lusieri in 1820, he wrote that "If Lord Elgin had possessed real taste in lieu of a covetous spirit he would have done just the reverse of what he has, he would have removed the rubbish and left the antiquities."In 1810, Elgin published a defence of his actions, in which he argued that he had only decided to remove the marbles when he realised that they were not being cared for by Ottoman officials and were in danger of falling into the hands of Napoleon's army.

Elgin began negotiations for the sale of the collection to the British Museum in 1811, but talks failed when the government offered only £30,000, which was less than half of his expenses relating to the marbles. The following years marked an increased interest in classical Greece, and Elgin procured testimonials from Ennio Quirino Visconti, director of the Louvre, and Antonio Canova of the Vatican Museum, who affirmed the high artistic value of the marbles.

In 1816, a House of Commons Select Committee found that the marbles were of high artistic value and recommended that the government purchase them for £35,000 to further the cultivation of the fine arts in Britain. In June 1816, after further debate, parliament approved the purchase of the marbles by a vote of 82–30.

Felicia Hemans supported the purchase of the marbles and, in her Modern Greece: A Poem (1817), defied Byron with the question::And who may grieve that, rescued from their hands,
Spoilers of excellence and foes of art,
Thy relics, Athens! borne to other lands
Claim homage still to thee from every heart?and quoted Haydon and other defenders of their accessibility in her notes.

Goethe thought the British government's decision to buy the marbles would herald, "a new age of great art". The marbles went on public display in a temporary room of the British Museum in 1817 and soon broke attendance records for the museum. John Keats visited the British Museum in 1817, recording his feelings in the sonnet titled "On Seeing the Elgin Marbles". Some lines of his "Ode on a Grecian Urn" are also thought to have been inspired by his visit to the Elgin Marbles. William Wordsworth also viewed the marbles and commented favourably on their aesthetics in a letter to Haydon.

The marbles were later displayed in the specially constructed Elgin Saloon (1832) and became the preferred models for academic training in fine arts. Plaster casts of the marbles were in high demand and were distributed to museums, private collectors and heads of state throughout the world.

The marbles were moved to the Duveen Gallery, named after Joseph Duveen, 1st Baron Duveen, in 1939 where they continued to attract record attendances.

Damage

Morosini

Prior damage to the marbles was sustained during successive wars, and it was during such conflicts that the Parthenon and its artwork sustained, by far, the most extensive damage. In particular, an explosion ignited by Venetian gun and cannon-fire bombardment in 1687, whilst the Parthenon was used as a munitions store during the Ottoman rule, destroyed or damaged many pieces of Parthenon art, including some of that later removed by Elgin. It was this explosion that sent the marble roof, most of the cella walls, 14 columns from the north and south peristyles, and carved metopes and frieze blocks flying and crashing to the ground, destroying much of the artwork. Further damage to the Parthenon's artwork occurred when the Venetian general Francesco Morosini looted the site of its larger sculptures.

War of Independence
The Erechtheion was used as a munitions store by the Ottomans during the Greek War of Independence (1821–1833) which ended the 355-year Ottoman rule of Athens. The Acropolis was besieged twice during the war, first by the Greeks in 1821–22 and then by the Ottoman forces in 1826–27. During the first siege the besieged Ottoman forces attempted to melt the lead in the columns to cast bullets, even prompting the Greeks to offer their own bullets to the Ottomans in order to minimize damage.

Elgin
Elgin consulted with Italian sculptor Antonio Canova in 1803 about how best to restore the marbles. Canova was considered by some to be the world's best sculptural restorer of the time; Elgin wrote that Canova declined to work on the marbles for fear of damaging them further.

To facilitate transport by Elgin, the columns' capitals and many metopes and frieze slabs were either hacked off the main structure or sawn and sliced into smaller sections, causing irreparable damage to the Parthenon itself. One shipload of marbles on board the British brig Mentor was caught in a storm off Cape Matapan in southern Greece and sank near Kythera, but was salvaged at the Earl's personal expense; it took two years to bring them to the surface.

British Museum

The artefacts held in London suffered from 19th-century pollution which persisted until the mid-20th century and have suffered irreparable damage by previous cleaning methods employed by British Museum staff.

As early as 1838, scientist Michael Faraday was asked to provide a solution to the problem of the deteriorating surface of the marbles. The outcome is described in the following excerpt from the letter he sent to Henry Milman, a commissioner for the National Gallery.
The marbles generally were very dirty ... from a deposit of dust and soot. ... I found the body of the marble beneath the surface white. ... The application of water, applied by a sponge or soft cloth, removed the coarsest dirt. ... The use of fine, gritty powder, with the water and rubbing, though it more quickly removed the upper dirt, left much embedded in the cellular surface of the marble. I then applied alkalies, both carbonated and caustic; these quickened the loosening of the surface dirt ... but they fell far short of restoring the marble surface to its proper hue and state of cleanliness. I finally used dilute nitric acid, and even this failed. ... The examination has made me despair of the possibility of presenting the marbles in the British Museum in that state of purity and whiteness which they originally possessed.

A further effort to clean the marbles ensued in 1858. Richard Westmacott, who was appointed superintendent of the "moving and cleaning the sculptures" in 1857, in a letter approved by the British Museum Standing Committee on 13 March 1858 concluded
I think it my duty to say that some of the works are much damaged by ignorant or careless moulding – with oil and lard – and by restorations in wax and resin. These mistakes have caused discolouration. I shall endeavour to remedy this without, however, having recourse to any composition that can injure the surface of the marble.
Yet another effort to clean the marbles occurred in 1937–38. This time the incentive was provided by the construction of a new Gallery to house the collection. The Pentelic marble mined from Mount Pentelicus north of Athens, from which the sculptures are made, naturally acquires a tan colour similar to honey when exposed to air; this colouring is often known as the marble's "patina" but Lord Duveen, who financed the whole undertaking, acting under the misconception that the marbles were originally white probably arranged for the team of masons working in the project to remove discolouration from some of the sculptures. The tools used were seven scrapers, one chisel and a piece of carborundum stone. They are now deposited in the British Museum's Department of Preservation. The cleaning process scraped away some of the detailed tone of many carvings. According to Harold Plenderleith, the surface removed in some places may have been as much as one-tenth of an inch (2.5 mm).

The British Museum has responded with the statement that "mistakes were made at that time." On another occasion it was said that "the damage had been exaggerated for political reasons" and that "the Greeks were guilty of excessive cleaning of the marbles before they were brought to Britain." During the international symposium on the cleaning of the marbles, organised by the British Museum in 1999, curator Ian Jenkins, deputy keeper of Greek and Roman antiquities, remarked that "The British Museum is not infallible, it is not the Pope. Its history has been a series of good intentions marred by the occasional cock-up, and the 1930s cleaning was such a cock-up". Nonetheless, he claimed that the prime cause for the damage inflicted upon the marbles was the 2000-year-long weathering on the Acropolis.

American archeologist Dorothy King, in a newspaper article, wrote that techniques similar to the ones used in 1937–38 were applied by Greeks as well in more recent decades than the British, and maintained that Italians still find them acceptable. The British Museum said that a similar cleaning of the Temple of Hephaestus in the Athenian Agora was carried out by the conservation team of the American School of Classical Studies at Athens in 1953 using steel chisels and brass wire. According to the Greek ministry of Culture, the cleaning was carefully limited to surface salt crusts. The 1953 American report concluded that the techniques applied were aimed at removing the black deposit formed by rain-water and "brought out the high technical quality of the carving" revealing at the same time "a few surviving particles of colour".

Documents released by the British Museum under the Freedom of Information Act revealed that a series of minor accidents, thefts and acts of vandalism by visitors have inflicted further damage to the sculptures. This includes an incident in 1961 when two schoolboys knocked off a part of a centaur's leg. In June 1981, a west pediment figure was slightly chipped by a falling glass skylight, and in 1966 four shallow lines were scratched on the back of one of the figures by vandals. In 1970 letters were scratched on to the upper right thigh of another figure. Four years later, the dowel hole in a centaur's hoof was damaged by thieves trying to extract pieces of lead.

Athens
Air pollution and acid rain have damaged the marble and stonework. The last remaining slabs from the western section of the Parthenon frieze were removed from the monument in 1993 for fear of further damage. They have now been transported to the New Acropolis Museum.

Until cleaning of the remaining marbles was completed in 2005, black crusts and coatings were present on the marble surface. The laser technique applied on the 14 slabs that Elgin did not remove revealed a surprising array of original details, such as the original chisel marks and the veins on the horses' bellies. Similar features in the British Museum collection have been scraped and scrubbed with chisels to make the marbles look white. Between 20 January and the end of March 2008, 4200 items (sculptures, inscriptions small terracotta objects), including some 80 artefacts dismantled from the monuments in recent years, were removed from the old museum on the Acropolis to the new Acropolis Museum. Natural disasters have also affected the Parthenon. In 1981, an earthquake caused damage to the east façade.

Return controversy

Greek requests for return 
In 1835, the government of the newly independent Greece asked the British Museum to return the Elgin Marbles, and in 1890 the Greek minister in London asked for the return of the architectural fragments. In 1983 the Greek government formally asked the UK government to return the marbles to Greece and, in 1984, listed the dispute with UNESCO. The Greek government is only requesting the return of the sculptures Elgin took from the Parthenon. In 2000, a select committee of the UK parliament held an inquiry into the illegal trade in cultural property which considered the dispute over the marbles. The committee heard evidence from the then Greek foreign minister, George Papandreou, who argued that the question of legal ownership was secondary to the ethical and cultural arguments for returning the sculptures. The committee, however, made no recommendations on the future of the marbles.

In 2000, the Greek government commissioned the construction of a new Acropolis Museum which opened in 2009. The museum was, in part, designed to arrange the surviving Parthenon sculptures (including those in the Elgin collection) as they originally stood on the Parthenon itself, and to counter arguments that the Elgin Marbles would be better preserved and displayed in the British Museum. The Acropolis Museum displays a portion of the remaining frieze (about 20% has been lost or destroyed), aligned in orientation and within sight of the Parthenon, with the position of the elements held in London clearly marked and space left should they be returned to Athens.

In 2013, the Greek government asked UNESCO to mediate between the Greek and UK authorities on the return of the marbles, but the UK government and the British Museum declined UNESCO's offer to mediate. In 2021, UNESCO concluded that the UK government had an obligation to return the marbles and called upon the UK government to open negotiations with Greece.

In late 2022, British and Greek authorities resumed negotiations on the future of the marbles. Asked about the possible return of the Marbles, the current British Culture Secretary, Michelle Donelan replied: "I can sympathise with some of the arguments but I do think that is a very dangerous and slippy road to embark down," expressing the worry that other cultural items now held in Britain might also have to be returned to the places they were acquired from.

Rationale for returning to Athens
Those arguing for the marbles' return cite legal, moral, cultural, conservation and artistic grounds. Their arguments include:

 The marbles were obtained illegally, or at least unethically, and hence should be returned to their rightful owner.
 While the marbles are of universal cultural value, they are also part of the unique cultural heritage of Greece, and this is the most fitting location for them to be displayed.
 The Parthenon sculptures around the world should be reunited in order to restore "organic elements" which "at present remain without cohesion, homogeneity and historicity of the monument to which they belong" and allow visitors to better appreciate them as a whole.
 Presenting all the extant Parthenon Marbles near their original historical and cultural environment, and in the context of other Greek antiquities, would permit their "fuller understanding and interpretation";
 Safekeeping of the marbles would be ensured at the Acropolis Museum, as it is equipped with state-of-the-art technology for the protection and preservation of exhibits.
 The Elgin Marbles have suffered significant damage from poor conservation and accidents in London and it cannot be assumed they will be better preserved there.
 Returning the Parthenon sculptures would not set a precedent for other restitution claims because of the distinctively "universal value" of the Parthenon.

Rationale for remaining in London
A range of different arguments has been presented by scholars, British political leaders and the British Museum for the retention of the Elgin Marbles in London. Their arguments include:

 Elgin acquired the marbles legally and no court of law would find in favour of a Greek complainant.
 Elgin rescued the marbles from destruction and those in the British Museum are in better condition than those left behind. The British Museum has a right to retain and publicly display what it preserved from destruction.
 Bringing the Parthenon sculptures together as a unified whole is impossible as half had been lost or destroyed by 1800.
 The British Museum display allows the marbles to be better viewed in the context of other major ancient cultures and thus complements the perspective provided by the Acropolis Museum collection.
 Fulfilling all restitution claims would empty most of the world's great museums—this has also caused concerns among other European and American museums, with one potential target being the Nefertiti Bust in Berlin's Neues Museum; in addition, portions of Parthenon marbles are kept by many other European museums.
 The British Museum receive about 6 million visitors per year as opposed to 1.5 million visitors to the Acropolis Museum. The removal of the marbles to Greece would significantly reduce the number of people who have the opportunity to visit the marbles.
 The Elgin Marbles have been on public display in England since 1807 and in that time have become a part of the British cultural heritage.

Public campaigns for return 
Outside Greece, a campaign for the return of the marbles began in 1981 with the formation of the International Organising Committee – Australia – for the Restitution of the Parthenon Marbles, and in 1983, with the formation of the British Committee for the Reunification of the Parthenon Marbles. Campaign organisations also exist in Greece and around the world.

A number of British and international celebrities such as comedian Stephen Fry and actor George Clooney have expressed their support for the return of the marbles.

Opinion polls
An Ipsos MORI poll of British voters in 1998, found 39% in favour of returning the marbles to Greece and 15% in favour of keeping them in Britain. 45% had no opinion or would not vote if the question were put to a referendum. Another Mori poll in 2002 showed similar results. A  Yougov poll in 2021 found that 59% of British respondents thought the Parthenon marbles belonged in Greece, 18% that they belonged in Britain, and 18% didn't know.

British press
The Guardian published an editorial in 2020 reiterating its support for the return of the Parthenon marbles. In January 2022, The Times reversed its long-standing support for retaining the marbles, publishing an editorial calling for their return to Greece. The Daily Telegraph published an editorial in January 2023 arguing that any decision on the return of the Elgin Marbles to Greece should be made by the UK parliament.

A psychological view
Christopher Wingfield states that controversies over former objects of worship such as the Elgin Marbles, the Benin Bronzes and the Sultanganj Buddha attract strong emotional responses either of devotion or of rejection, the latter sometimes taking the form of wishing to be rid of their presence by sending them back to where they came from. The controversy they elicit arises as a psychological response, an "iconoclash", transcending questions of right or wrong.

Loan to the Hermitage Museum

The British Museum lent the figure of a river-god, possibly the river Ilisus, to the Hermitage Museum in Saint Petersburg to celebrate its 250th anniversary. It was on display there from 6 December 2014 until 18 January 2015. This was the first time the British Museum had lent part of its Parthenon Marbles collection and it caused some controversy.

See also
Parthenon Frieze
Metopes of the Parthenon
Pediments of the Parthenon
Palermo Fragment
Greece–United Kingdom relations

References

Sources
 "A Downing Street spokeswoman" (2020), reportage of employee of Sky, Comcast NBCUniversal (2020) — Row over Elgin Marbles as EU demands return of 'unlawfully removed cultural objects', published by Sky News 19 February 2020 – accessed 19 February 2020

Further reading
 
 
 
  (with essays by Robert Browning and Graham Binns)

External links

Acropolis Museum
The Parthenon Frieze
The British Museum Parthenon pages

Pros and cons of restitution

British Committee for the Reunification of the Parthenon Marbles' site
The Parthenon Project
"The Case for Lord Elgin," Classics for All
Gillen Wood, "The strange case of Lord Elgin's nose": the cultural context of the early 19th century debate over the marbles, the politics & the aesthetics, imperialism and hellenism
Two memorandums submitted to the UK Parliamentary Select Committee on Culture, Media and Sport in 2000.

 
5th-century BC Greek sculptures
Parthenon
Art and cultural repatriation
Greece–United Kingdom relations
Ancient Greek and Roman sculptures in the British Museum
History of museums
History of Athens
Marble sculptures in the United Kingdom
Sculptures by Phidias
Archaeological discoveries in Greece
19th century in Athens
Horses in art
Architectural sculpture
Thomas Bruce, 7th Earl of Elgin
Sculptures of Dionysus